Kim Suominen (20 October 1969 – 18 November 2021) was a Finnish footballer who played as a midfielder.

Honours
TPS:
 Finnish Cup: 1991
 Mestaruussarja: runner-up 1989

TPV
 Veikkausliiga: 1994

References
 Profile at the national-football-teams.com
 Veikkausliigan verkkonäyttely
 Finnish Players Abroad

1969 births
2021 deaths
Finnish footballers
Association football midfielders
Finland international footballers
Turun Palloseura footballers
FF Jaro players
FC Inter Turku players
FC Jazz players
Mestaruussarja players
Veikkausliiga players
Austrian Football Bundesliga players
FC Admira Wacker Mödling players
IFK Norrköping players
Allsvenskan players
Finnish expatriate footballers
Expatriate footballers in Sweden
Expatriate footballers in Austria
Footballers from Turku